Vasile Negrea (born 11 February 1942) is a Romanian former football left midfielder.

Honours
Steaua București
Divizia A: 1967–68
Cupa României: 1965–66, 1966–67, 1968–69, 1969–70, 1970–71

References

External links
Vasile Negrea at Labtof.ro

1942 births
Living people
Romanian footballers
Association football midfielders
Liga I players
Liga II players
FC Steaua București players
Faur București players
Sportspeople from Brăila